Rivière-Éternité is a municipality, being part of Le Fjord-du-Saguenay Regional County Municipality, located in the administrative region of Saguenay–Lac-Saint-Jean, in Quebec, Canada.

Geography 

Rivière-Éternité is a small village in Quebec set in the valley of the Éternité River.

It is crossed by route 170.

Toponymy 
The Commission de toponymie du Québec writes about it: “The name of this municipality of Saguenay, officially created in 1974, was borrowed from the river that flows there. However, the reason for the designation of this tributary of the Saguenay River, collected between Cape Éternité and Cape Trinité, is unknown. Without doubt, the proximity of Cape Eternity, which evokes the beyond, played a role in the choice of this name which alludes to the absence of beginning and end of the existence of God. Before making us think of the beyond, the term evokes a very long duration. "

She continues: “The landscapes seem to have been fixed there forever and forever, majestically. This name, in addition to identifying the post office established in 1933 and the parish of Notre-Dame-de-l'Éternité erected canonically in 1967, covers the municipality located between Saint-Félix-d'Otis and L'Anse-Saint-Jean. It is the gateway to Saguenay National Park. The presence of water and impressive capes gives the eternity decor a magnificent magnificence in accordance with the extent of the territory which occupies an area of almost 500 km². The specific Eternity appears in documents written since at least 1824, according to the captain Louis Sivrac, and  indicates the cap Éternité, in 1880. "

History 

 July 20 1974: Constitution of the "municipality of Rivière-Éternité" from unorganized territory.

Demography 

The 2016 census counted 413 inhabitants, 13.1% less than in 2011.

Administration 
Municipal elections are held as a block for the mayor and the six councilors.

Attractions 
One of its attractions is the Eternity Bay sector of the Saguenay Fjord National Park where the fjord reaches its maximum depth. The Cap Trinité path which leads to the statue of Notre-Dame-du-Saguenay offers one of the best views of the fjord.

Gallery

References

External links 

Municipalities in Quebec
Incorporated places in Saguenay–Lac-Saint-Jean